The discography of British virtual band Gorillaz consists of eight studio albums, three compilation albums, 11 extended plays, one remix album, and 46 singles.

Gorillaz were formed in 1998 by Damon Albarn of alternative rock band Blur, and Jamie Hewlett, co-creator of the comic book Tank Girl. In 2001, the band released their first studio album, Gorillaz, followed by Demon Days in 2005, Plastic Beach in 2010, The Fall in 2011,  Humanz in 2017, The Now Now in 2018, Song Machine, Season One: Strange Timez in 2020, and Cracker Island in 2023. In November 2011, Gorillaz released The Singles Collection 2001–2011. In August 2021, Gorillaz released their Meanwhile EP. As of 2021, Gorillaz have accumulated 3,872,838 album sales in the UK.

Albums

Studio albums

Compilation albums

Remix albums

Video albums

Extended plays

Singles

Other charted and certified songs

Guest appearances

Videography

Music videos

Cancelled videos

Documentaries

See also 
 Blur discography
 Damon Albarn discography
 The Good, the Bad & the Queen discography

Notes

References

External links 
 
 
 

Discography
Rap rock discographies
Discographies of British artists